, also known as Miss Critical Moment, is a Japanese manga series written and illustrated by Shigemitsu Harada. It was serialized in Kodansha's seinen manga magazine Weekly Young Magazine from January 1998 to February 2000, and was collected into six tankōbon volumes, released from July 1998 to March 2000. The manga follows a woman named Kunyan and her many comedic misfortunes.

It was adapted into an anime series by Group TAC, originally broadcast on TBS in October 1999.

Plot 
Kunyan is a 20 year old international student from China, who is smart, pretty, and athletic. However, due to her bad drinking habits (which are never mentioned or shown in the anime), she constantly finds herself in many crisis situations in her daily life.

Characters

Media

Manga 
Ippatsu Kiki Musume is  written and illustrated by Shigemitsu Harada. It was serialized in Weekly Young Magazine from January 1998 to February 2000, with its 81 chapters collected into six tankōbon volumes, released from July 1998 to March 2000.

Volume list

Anime 
A 16-episode anime series adapted by Group TAC aired on TBS from October 5 to October 29, 1999 on the TV variety show, . Each episode had a runtime of 3 minutes.

Episode list

References

External links 
 Official manga website 
 

Comedy anime and manga
Group TAC
Kodansha manga
Seinen manga
TBS Television (Japan) original programming